Pernille Agerholm (born 14 May 1991) is a Danish table tennis player. Her highest career ITTF ranking was 36.

References

1991 births
Living people
Danish female table tennis players